Jason Davis (born 15 September 1973 in Sydney, New South Wales, Australia), known professionally as Jabba, is an Australian actor, media personality, video jockey, television and radio host, who first made a name for himself as part of the launch of subscription television in Australia in 1995. He was a host for music television station "Red" on the now-defunct Galaxy subscription television network, before the channel changed its name to Channel V. Jason the jabba was part of a famous Incubus live performance at a secret gig in Bondi 2002.

Early life
Born Jason Davis, Jabba attended Hunters Hill Primary School, where he gained his name, and James Ruse Agricultural High School. He also played with the All Saints Hunters Hill soccer team, and Parramatta Waterpolo Club.

Career
Jabba began presenting for Foxtel's Channel [V] in 1994.
He hosted a variety of shows including The Joint and Jabba's Morning Glory, which featured performances and interviews with prominent musicians including Pink and Beastie Boys . During his time with [V], he played the role of "Davo "Dazza" Dinkum" in the SBS television comedy show Pizza and Swift and Shift couriers.

In 2004, Jabba participated in the Band in a Bubble project with Australian alternative rock band Regurgitator, which involved him being locked in a Big Brother-style environment with the group and their engineers while they produced an album under 24-hour surveillance. During this time, it was revealed that he had separated from his long-term partner and mother of his children. Following the projects conclusion, Jacquie Riddell of XYZ Networks, announced that Jabba would be taking an extended break, stating that "(the bubble) was a pretty big deal". In 2005, he left [V] and began presenting for Nova FM in Brisbane.

Jabba later moved back home to Sydney, working at Nova 96.9 hosting The All New Nova Top 10 with Jabba and Mel, while still also hosting the Motorola ARIA Charts show on Sunday afternoons, which is Nova's only national show. Jabba also writes a column for the Australian edition of Rolling Stone. Although, in November 2008 Jabba and Mel left The All New Nova Top 10 with Jabba and Mel they were replaced by James Kerley and Maz Compton.

Jabba was also the host of Great BBQ Challenge, a competition series on Foxtel's LifeStyle Food channel. It was a contest to find Australia's best BBQer, who would win $25,000 and go on to host their own show on Lifestyle FOOD. He has been named by some (one actually) as a 'Social recalcitrant'. "It sort of slid when he left the international passport to smoking pleasure behind"

Jabba's next career move in March 2010 was as host of a new Breakfast radio program with Mike Goldman called "Macarthur Breakfast" on the Win TV Network's C91.3 FM in Campbelltown, NSW. Jabba and Mike left the station in December 2010 as they have refused to move to Campbelltown, as it was important for the station to be as local as possible.

In 2011, he appeared on two SBS sitcoms: Swift and Shift Couriers and Housos. In 2014 he was featured in the motion picture Fat Pizza vs. Housos.

Collection of works

Filmography

Television
The Joint (as Himself-Host) (1999)
Pizza (as Middle Class Homeboy & as Davo Dinkum) (2000–2007)
Jabba's Morning Glory (as Himself-Host) (2002)
Pizza Live (as Davo Dinkum) (2004)
World Record Pizza (as Davo Dinkum) (2006)
Pull Up Selecta (as Himself-Host) (2006)
Great BBQ Challenge (as Himself-Host) (2006–2007)
20 to 1 (Himself) (2007–2010)
2008 National Musicoz Awards (as Himself-Host) (2008)
Swift and Shift Couriers (as various recurring characters) (2008, 2011)
Dirtgirlworld (as Hayman) (2009)
Jabba's Curious World (as Himself-Presenter) (2011)
The Essential 20 (as Himself-Presenter) (2011)
Housos (as Dazza) (2011)

Awards
Jabba was nominated for and won the Best Music Personality at the 2007 Australian Commercial Radio Awards held at Crown Casino.

References

External links

1973 births
Australian music critics
Australian music journalists
Australian male television actors
Australian television presenters
People educated at James Ruse Agricultural High School
Living people
Australian VJs (media personalities)